BZD may stand for:

 Balranald Airport, IATA airport code "BZD"
 Belize dollar, ISO 4217 currency code
 Belorusskaja Železnaja Doroga, national railway company in Belarus
 Benzodiazepines, class of drugs